The Bhutan laughingthrush (Trochalopteron imbricatum) is a species of bird in the family Leiothrichidae.  It is commonly found in Bhutan and some adjoining areas in India.  It was formerly considered a subspecies of the streaked laughingthrush, G. lineatus, hence its alternate common name of Himalayan streaked laughingthrush.

References

Bhutan laughingthrush
Birds of Bhutan
Bhutan laughingthrush
Bhutan laughingthrush